Clermont Steel Fabricators (abbreviated as CSF) is a private steel products manufacturing company known for making Bolliger & Mabillard roller coasters. The plant is located in Batavia, Ohio. CSF was founded in 2004 after the closing of Southern Ohio Fabricators. As of 2013, Clermont has 65 employees.

History
In 1989, Walter Bolliger asked Ken Miller, the current general manager of Clermont and then at Southern Ohio Fabricators, if he would be interested in manufacturing roller coasters for Bolliger's company, Bolliger & Mabillard of Switzerland. As a result, Southern Ohio Fabricators manufactured its first  roller coaster, Iron Wolf at Six Flags Great America. Southern Ohio Fabricators's main focus was manufacturing commercial and industrial buildings. In 2004, Southern Ohio Fabricators closed, and Ken Miller and a group of investors bought the company and renamed it to Clermont Steel Fabricators. They also made the decision to change the focus to manufacturing roller coasters.

The company manufactures other steel products, including turbine power bases and enclosures, heavy weldments, machine bases, structural steel, louvers and dampers, and industrial equipment.

Location
Clermont Steel Fabricators is situated in Batavia across Old State Route 32 from the former Ford Batavia Transmission plant which closed in 2008.

References

Companies based in Ohio
Manufacturing companies of the United States
Roller coaster manufacturers
Manufacturing companies established in 2004
2004 establishments in Ohio